Dichorda illustraria is a species of emerald moth in the family Geometridae. It is found in Central America and North America.

The MONA or Hodges number for Dichorda illustraria is 7055.

References

Further reading

External links

 

Geometrinae
Articles created by Qbugbot
Moths described in 1886